Csabacsűd is a village in Békés County, in the Southern Great Plain region of south-east Hungary.

Geography
It covers an area of 66.88 km2 and has a population of 2130 people (2002).

External links

  in Hungarian

Populated places in Békés County